David B. Williams (January 7, 1919 – December 5, 1994) was an American jurist and politician who served as presiding judge of Ayer District Court and was a member of the Massachusetts House of Representatives and Massachusetts Governor's Council.

Early life
Williams was born on January 7, 1919, in Boston. He graduated from Governor Dummer Academy and Harvard College. During World War II he enlisted in the United States Army Air Forces. After the war he resumed his education. He graduated from the Boston University School of Law in 1947.

Political career
From 1947 to 1948, Williams served as the clerk of the Central Middlesex District Court. In 1948 he was elected to the Massachusetts House of Representatives. In 1953 he was appointed to the Massachusetts Governor's Council. He lost his bid for a full term to Endicott Peabody 50.3% to 49.2%.

From 1949 to 1953 he served as town counsel in Carlisle, Massachusetts.

Judicial career
In 1954, Williams was appointed as justice of the Ayer District Court. From 1965 until his retirement in 1989 he was the court's first presiding justice.

Disabled American Veterans
On July 16, 1955, Williams was elected commander of the Massachusetts Department of the Disabled American Veterans. On August 15, 1958, Williams was elected national commander of the DAV. He defeated Joe F. Ramsey by 40 votes.

Death
Williams died on December 5, 1994, in Concord, Massachusetts.

See also
 1951–1952 Massachusetts legislature
 1953–1954 Massachusetts legislature

References

1919 births
1994 deaths
20th-century American politicians
Boston University School of Law alumni
Harvard College alumni
Massachusetts state court judges
Members of the Massachusetts Governor's Council
Republican Party members of the Massachusetts House of Representatives
People from Concord, Massachusetts
20th-century American judges
The Governor's Academy alumni
United States Army Air Forces personnel of World War II